Rath may refer to:

Places

Ireland
Ráth Cairn, village in County Meath
Rath, County Clare, a civil parish in County Clare
Rath, County Offaly, a village in south-west Offaly
Rath, County Tipperary, a townland in County Tipperary
 Two different townlands in County Westmeath 
 Rath, Kilkenny West, a townland in Kilkenny West (civil parish)
 Rath, Street, a townland in Street, County Westmeath (civil parish)

Other countries
Mount Rath, Antarctica
Düsseldorf-Rath, Germany
Rath, India, a town in Uttar Pradesh

People
Rath (surname)
Rath (Odia surname) a form of Rathi, a general surname also used by  Oriya/Utkal Brahmins from the Indian state of Orissa
Rath Sarem, Cambodian politician

Businesses and organizations
Rath Packing Company, a defunct meat packer formerly located in Waterloo, Iowa
Thai Rath, national Thai-language daily newspaper published in Bangkok
Musée Rath, art museum in Geneva

Fictional uses
Rath block, a block of three Magic: The Gathering game expansions
Rath, an alien transformation in Ben 10: Alien Force
Rath, a character in the Mummies Alive! TV series
Immanuel Rath, leading character in the 1930 film The Blue Angel and the 1959 remake
Rath, a creation of Lewis Carroll in Jabberwocky
Rath Illuser, character in the manga Dragon Knights

Other uses
Rath tribe, a Rajput ethnic group from northern India
Ráth (anglicised rath), Irish for ringfort
Rath, a breed of zebu cattle

See also
Wrath (disambiguation)
Rath House, Chicago, Illinois
Ballyfounder Rath, a ringfort situated in County Down, Northern Ireland
Ratha, Indo-Iranian term for spoked-wheel chariot or cart of antiquity
Ratha-Yatra, a public procession in a chariot